François Théodore Devaulx, or Théodore-François Devaulx, (September 15, 1808 – January 21, 1871) was a French sculptor.

Biography 

In 1823, Devaulx was a student of Jules Ramey (1796 - 1852) at the École des beaux-arts de Paris. He received the a second prize at the prix de Rome in 1833.

He participated in the Salon des artistes français, of which he was a member, from 1845 to 1870. He received a third class medal at the Paris salon in 1849.

He is buried in the Père Lachaise Cemetery 36th division.

Works

Public collections
 Esquisse pour le concours de sculpture de la République (1848), Château de Nemours
 Amphitrite (1866), façade nord de la cour Carrée du palais du Louvre à Paris
 Général Bouscarin, musée du domaine national de Versailles
Cavalier grec (1853) in stone, a statue installed on one of the pillars of the pont d'Iéna bridge in Paris.
Mme Devaulx, sa femme, in the Petit Palais, fine arts museum of the city of Paris

Bibliography 
 Emmanuel Bénézit, Dictionnaire des peintres, sculpteurs, dessinateurs et graveurs, tome 3, Gründ, 1976. .

References 

1808 births
1878 deaths
19th-century French sculptors
École nationale supérieure des arts décoratifs alumni
Artists from Paris
Prix de Rome for sculpture